The Comptroller of the Army has General Staff responsibility for independent review and analysis of Army programs, and analysis of major Army commands; finance and accounting, fiscal, audit, budgetary, progress and statistical reporting, reports control, cost analysis, and management analysis activities of the Army; legislative policies and programs pertaining to appropriation acts; management systems of the Army; overall management improvement; and analysis of Army organization, functions, and procedures. He exercises General Staff supervision over Chief, United States Army Audit Agency. The Comptroller of the Army is under the direction and supervision of, and is directly responsible to, the Assistant Secretary of the Army (Financial Management), for financial management matters, by delegation of the Secretary of the Army, with concurrent responsibility to the Chief of Staff. The Comptroller of the Army's relationship to the Chief of Staff corresponds to that of a Deputy Chief of Staff. The last person to hold this position was Lt. Gen. Merle Freitag until his retirement in 1994. After his retirement, the office was abolished and the position was combined with the Assistant Secretary of the Army (Financial Management). After that, the position was renamed the Assistant Secretary of the Army (Financial Management and Comptroller).

List of Comptrollers and Acting Comptrollers of the United States Army (incomplete)
January 2, 1948 - July 15, 1948: Maj. Gen. George J. Richards
July 16, 1948 - November 14, 1948; November 15, 1948 - June 30, 1949: Maj. Gen. Edmond H. Leavey
August 1, 1949 - April 30, 1952: Brig. Gen. Raymond S. McLain
April 1950 - August 1950: Brig. Gen. William H. Arnold (acting)
May 1, 1950 - January 6, 1955: Maj. Gen. George H. Decker
1955 - 1957: Lt. Gen. Laurin L. Williams
July 1, 1957 - May 31, 1960: Maj. Gen. William S. Lawton
1960 - 1962: Lt. Gen. David W. Traub
1962 - 1963: Lt. Gen. Charles B. Duff
1963 - 1966: Lt. Gen. Robert Hackett
1966 - 1970: Lt. Gen. Frank J. Sackton
1970 - 1972: Lt. Gen. John M. Wright, Jr.
1972 - 1973: unknown
1973 - 1974: Lt. Gen. Edward M. Flanagan, Jr.
1974 - 1977: Lt. Gen. John A. Kjellstrom
1977 - 1981: Lt. Gen. Richard L. West
1981 - 1984: Lt. Gen. Ernest D. Peixotto
1984 - 1988: Lt. Gen. Max W. Noah
1988 - 1991: Lt. Gen. James F. McCall
1991 - 1994: Lt. Gen. Merle Freitag

References

Department of the Army staff
United States Army organization